Brisbane Golf Club is an 18-hole golf course in Tennyson Memorial Avenue, Yeerongpilly, Queensland in the City of Brisbane, Queensland, Australia.

History
The golf course was originally established in Chelmer with an official opening on Saturday 12 December 1896 by the Queensland Governor Lord Lamington. In 1903 the course relocated to its current site, a larger piece of land in Yeerongpilly in 1903.

References

External links

1896 establishments in Australia
Sports clubs established in 1896
Sports venues completed in 1896
Golf clubs and courses in Queensland
Sport in Brisbane